Southern Actor is a former whale catcher, currently a museum ship based in Sandefjord, Norway and owned by Sandefjord Museum. It is the only whale catcher from the Modern Whaling Epoch still to be in its original working order. Over 100,000 hours have been spent on restoring the vessel.

Southern Actor  was built in 1950 at Smiths Dock, Middlesbrough, England, for the whaling company Christian Salvesen Ltd in Leith, Scotland. Many of Salvesen's employees were Norwegian mostly from Vestfold. The ship was in Norway for maintenance in the summer.

In 1995, Southern Actor was fully restored, as authentically as possible in relation to the way the boat was originally constructed. That same year she was declared worthy of preservation by Riksantikvaren, the Norwegian Directorate of Cultural Heritage. Southern Actor is in working order and can be chartered for excursions.

References

External links
 
 

Fishing vessels of Norway
Whaling ships
Museum ships in Norway
Museums in Vestfold og Telemark
Sandefjord
1950 ships
Ships built on the River Tees